John Valentine  is a former member of the Utah State Senate, who represented Utah's 14th Senate District from 1999 to 2014. Prior to being appointed to the Utah Senate he served in the Utah House of Representatives representing Utah's 58th House District from 1988 to 1992 and Utah's 59th House District from 1992 to 1998. Valentine served as the Utah Senate President from 2005–2008. On August 4, 2014, Valentine was appointed by Governor Gary R. Herbert to serve as Chair of the Utah State Tax Commission.

Early life, education and career 

John Valentine was born in Fullerton, California and graduated from Savanna High School, in Anaheim, California. He obtained a B.S. in Accounting and Economics from Brigham Young University (BYU) in 1973 and a J.D. from Brigham Young University's J. Reuben Clark School of Law in 1976. Upon graduating, Valentine joined the law firm Howard, Lewis & Petersen based in Provo, UT where he is now a managing partner. Valentine specializes in federal and estate taxation, estate planning, contract, and business law. Valentine has received an "AV" rating in Martindale-Hubble and is a Fellow in the American College of Trusts and Estate Counsel. Valentine was also awarded the Tax Practitioner of the Year award by the Utah State Bar in 2008. John has also served as an adjunct professor of law at Brigham Young University and is a certified mediator with Utah Dispute Resolution. Valentine is also certified as an Emergency Medical Technician (EMT) and has been an active volunteer member of the Utah County Search and Rescue Team for over 25 years.  As a lieutenant in the Search and Rescue Team, Valentine has participated in countless mountain, cave, and wilderness rescues.

Senator Valentine is also a CPA California Emergency Medical Technician, Utah State Bar Examiner, National Association Search and Rescue (NASAR) Instructor, Utah Bar Association member, member of the Tax Section and Tax Specialization Committee, member of the American Bar Association (tax section), executive board member of the Utah National Parks Council, Fellow in the American College for Trust and Estate Counsel, and a member of the NCSL Assembly on Fiscal Affairs and Oversight.

Valentine is married to his wife, Karen and they have 6 children together. Valentine is a member of the Church of Jesus Christ of Latter-day Saints.

Political career

John Valentine ran for the Utah House of Representatives for Utah's 59th House District in 1988 against Democrat Berdean Jarman. He won re-election in 1990, and in 1992 ran successfully for Utah's 58th House District. In 1998, Senator Valentine was appointed to the Utah State Senate in 1998 to replace Republican Senator Craig A. Peterson, representing the Utah's 14th Senate District. Senator Valentine has held a variety of leadership position in the Senate including Senate Majority Whip in 2001 and Senate President from 2005 to 2008.

In 2014, Senator Valentine served as the Senate Rules Committee Chairman. He also sat on the Higher Education Appropriations Subcommittee
Natural Resources, Agriculture, and Environmental Quality Appropriations Subcommittee, the Standing Senate Business and Labor Committee, and the Standing Senate Revenue and Taxation Committee.

2014 Sponsored Legislation

Valentine also Floor sponsored the following bills: 
HB0053 Restitution Amendments
HB0117S02 Patent Infringement Amendments
HB0118S01 Personal Injury Damages Amendments
HB0126 Retirement Amendments
HB0201S02 Visitation Amendments
HB0218 Tax Credit for Working Individuals and Families
HB0251S01 Unsworn Declaration Amendments
HB0253S01 State Fair Corporation Board Amendments
HB0277	Music Therapist Licensure Amendments
HB0287 Arbitration for Dog Bites Amendments
HB0293S01 Government Immunity Wildlife Waiver Amendments
HB0301 Concealed Weapon Permit for Servicemembers
HB0302S02 Voting Records Amendments
HB0325 Judicial Performance Evaluation Commission Amendments
HB0331S01 Identification Card Amendments
HB0336S01 Court System Task Force
HB0376 Alcohol Revisions
HB0394S02 Campaign Finance Revisions
HB0401S02 Utah Medicaid Program
HB0414S01 Legislative Subpoena Amendments
HCR004 Concurrent Resolution Recognizing the 20th Anniversary of the School and Institutional Trust Lands Administration
HJR007S01 Joint Rules Resolution on Legislative Review Notes
HJR023 Joint Resolution Endorsing Tier III Standards for Air Quality

References

Living people
American Latter Day Saints
Brigham Young University alumni
Republican Party members of the Utah House of Representatives
Republican Party Utah state senators
21st-century American politicians
Year of birth missing (living people)